Arsanjan (also Romanized as Arsanjān and Arsenjān; also known as Arsinjān) is a city and capital of Arsanjan County, Fars Province, Iran. At the 2006 census, its population was 17,642, in 4,397 families.

References

External links

 Arsanjan Tourism and Travel Information

Populated places in Arsanjan County

Cities in Fars Province